Ndjeka Mukando (born 17 November 1979) is a retired footballer from DR Congo.

Mukando was a member of the DR Congo squad for the 2000 Africa Cup of Nations.

External links

1979 births
Living people
Democratic Republic of the Congo footballers
Democratic Republic of the Congo international footballers
2000 African Cup of Nations players
Daring Club Motema Pembe players
Association football midfielders